Pader may refer to:

People with the surname
Hilaire Pader (1607-1677), French painter and poet.

Places
 Pader District, a district of Uganda
 Pader, Uganda, capital of Pader District
 Pader (river), a river in Germany

Organizations

 PADER, the Party for Democracy and Reconciliation
 PaDER, Pennsylvania Department of Environmental Protection